Charles Newton Kimball (born February 20, 1985) is an American race car driver currently competing in the IndyCar Series with A. J. Foyt Enterprises He has scored a win, six podiums, and 13 top 5s. His best season results were ninth in 2013 and 2016. In addition, he won the 2013 24 Hours of Daytona.

Career

2002–2005
Born in Chertsey, England, Kimball's single-seater career started in 2002 when he took part in the American Formula Dodge national championship, finishing the season in 10th place overall. He also won three races in the SCCA Formula Ford series. For 2003 he moved up to Formula Ford US, finishing third overall with two race wins and seven podium finishes. He also contested the UK Formula Ford winter series, taking one race win to finish third overall.

In 2004, he competed in the full UK Formula Ford championship for Team JLR, taking two race wins and eleven podiums on his way to fourth in the championship. In the end-of-season Formula Ford Festival at Brands Hatch he finished in eighth place. His performances earned him a drive with front runners Carlin Motorsport in the 2005 British Formula 3 Championship, where he took five race wins to finish an impressive second behind teammate Álvaro Parente. He also finished 12th in the Marlboro Masters at Zandvoort, but failed to finish the season-ending Macau Grand Prix.

2006–2008
For 2006 Kimball stayed in Formula Three, but moved up to the Formula 3 Euro Series with the French Signature-Plus team. He took one race win and three podiums to finish the season in eleventh place. Once again, he took part in the Masters Formula 3 race at Zandvoort and the Macau Grand Prix, finishing in 9th and 21st places respectively.

In 2007, he competed in the Formula Renault 3.5 Series for the Italian Victory Engineering team, alongside Dutchman Giedo van der Garde. He competed in 12 races (leaving the series with 2 race weekends remaining) and finished 24th in points with a best finish of 8th in the Monza and Nurburgring sprint races. His departed the team due to the onset of Type 1 diabetes which required hospitalization. As part of his ongoing treatment he wears a wireless blood sugar monitor and carries sugar water on board the car while racing. In 2008, he returned to F3 EuroSeries for 6 races with Prema Powerteam. Late in 2008 he competed in the first round of the A1 Grand Prix series for A1 Team USA.

Firestone Indy Lights (2009–2010)
For 2009 Kimball signed to drive in Indy Lights for the new Team PBIR outfit. He stated that an influencing factor in his return to the U.S. is to increase Diabetes awareness in his home country. Kimball finished 10th in points with a best finish of 4th at Watkins Glen International.

He returned to Indy Lights in 2010 and signed with AFS Racing/Andretti Autosport. Despite not winning a race or pole, Kimball had four second-place finishes on the season and captured 4th in points, one spot behind his teammate Martin Plowman.

IndyCar Series (2011–2021)

It was announced on December 16, 2010, that Kimball would move up to the IndyCar Series in 2011, in which he would drive the No. 83 entry for Chip Ganassi Racing. Kimball finished 19th in points with a best finish of ninth at the New Hampshire Motor Speedway.

Kimball returned to the team in 2012 and again finished 19th in points despite missing a race due to injury. He finished second at the Honda Indy Toronto, his first career podium finish. Kimball won his first IndyCar race on August 4, 2013, at the Honda Indy 200 at Mid-Ohio. He also finished second at Pocono and fourth at Barber and ranked 9th in points. In 2013, he competed in his first 24 Hours of Daytona race with Ganassi and was on the race-winning team with co-drivers Juan Pablo Montoya, Scott Pruett, and Memo Rojas.

In the 2014 IndyCar season, Kimball scored four top 5 finishes and placed 9th in points. In 2015 he finished third at the Indianapolis 500 and the Grand Prix of Sonoma, and finished 5th at the Grand Prix of Indianapolis. The driver finished fifth at both Indianapolis races and got 11 top 5s in 16 races, which earned him a 9th overall position in 2016. He scored no top 5s in 2017, and he parted with Ganassi afterward.

Carlin signed Kimball for the 2018 season. He got a fifth-place finish at Toronto and collected six top 10s. Kimball ran part-time in 2019, scoring two tenth-place finishes. He joined A. J. Foyt Enterprises in 2020, where he scored two top 10s. In 2021, Kimball failed to qualify for the Indy 500 for the first time in his career.

Personal
Kimball was born in England but grew up in Camarillo, California. His father Gordon was a designer of Formula One and Indy cars.

At 22, Kimball was diagnosed with type 1 diabetes and was forced to abandon his racing program midseason. Undeterred, he climbed back into the cockpit the following year and claimed a podium finish in his first race after returning. He is also the first licensed driver with diabetes in the history of IndyCar racing (Howdy Wilcox hid the fact he was driving with diabetes in the 1932 Indy 500 but was barred from competing when officials found out before the 1933 race). Novo Nordisk, the manufacturer of the insulin Kimball uses, became a full-time sponsor of his racing program in 2011.

Kimball married Kathleen, whom he first met in high school, in 2014, the wedding officiated by fellow driver James Hinchcliffe.  The couple relocated to Indianapolis, where they live with two dogs.  Kathleen earned her MBA from Indiana University Kelley School of Business, and works at Kimball Marketing Group.

Kimball is a long-time fan of the Los Angeles Dodgers baseball team.

Racing record

Complete Formula 3 Euro Series results
(key)

Complete Formula Renault 3.5 Series results
(key)

American open–wheel results
(key)

Indy Lights

IndyCar Series
(key)

* Season still in progress.
 1 The Las Vegas Indy 300 was abandoned after Dan Wheldon died from injuries sustained in a 15-car crash on lap 11.

Indianapolis 500

References

External links

Career summary at Driver Database
IndyCar Driver Page
IndyCar 11 in '11 video
IndyCar 36: Charlie Kimball - IndyCar documentary

1985 births
A1 Team USA drivers
Racing drivers from California
British Formula Three Championship drivers
World Series Formula V8 3.5 drivers
Formula 3 Euro Series drivers
Indianapolis 500 drivers
Indy Lights drivers
IndyCar Series drivers
Living people
Sportspeople from Chertsey
People with type 1 diabetes
24 Hours of Daytona drivers
Rolex Sports Car Series drivers
WeatherTech SportsCar Championship drivers
International Kart Federation drivers
U.S. F2000 National Championship drivers
Sportspeople from Ventura County, California
Carlin racing drivers
Signature Team drivers
Victory Engineering drivers
Prema Powerteam drivers
AFS Racing drivers
Chip Ganassi Racing drivers
A. J. Foyt Enterprises drivers
Andretti Autosport drivers